Crocanthes poliozona is a moth in the family Lecithoceridae. It was described by Kyu-Tek Park in 2011. It is found in Papua New Guinea.

The forewing markings and venation are similar to those of Crocanthes pancala, as are the hindwings.

Etymology
The species name is derived from Greek polios (meaning grey) and zone (meaning belt).

References

Moths described in 2011
Crocanthes